Gratian (18 April 359 – 25 August 383) was emperor of the Western Roman Empire from 367 to 383. The eldest son of Valentinian I, Gratian accompanied his father on several campaigns along the Rhine and Danube frontiers and was raised to the rank of Augustus in 367. Upon the death of Valentinian in 375, Gratian took over government of the west while his half-brother Valentinian II was also acclaimed emperor in Pannonia. Gratian governed the western provinces of the empire, while his uncle Valens was already the emperor over the east.

Gratian subsequently led a campaign across the Rhine, attacked the Lentienses, and forced the tribe to surrender. That same year, the eastern emperor Valens was killed fighting the Goths at the Battle of Adrianople, which led to Gratian elevating Theodosius to replace him in 379. Gratian favoured Nicene Christianity over traditional Roman religion, issuing the Edict of Thessalonica, refusing the office of pontifex maximus, and removing the Altar of Victory from the Roman Senate's Curia Julia. The city of Cularo on the Isère river in Roman Gaul was renamed  after him, which later evolved to Grenoble.

In 383, faced with rebellion by the usurper Magnus Maximus, Gratian marched his army towards Lutetia (Paris). His army deserted him. He fled to Lugdunum and was later murdered.

Early life 
According to the Chronicle of Jerome and the Chronicon Paschale, Valentinian's eldest son Gratian was born on 18 April 359 at Sirmium, now Sremska Mitrovica in Serbia, the capital of Pannonia Secunda, to Valentinian's first wife Marina Severa. Gratian was his parents' only son together. At the time of his birth Gratian's father was living in exile. Gratian was named after his grandfather Gratianus, who was a tribune and later comes of Britannia for Constantine the Great.

Following the death of the emperor Jovian, on 26 February 364, Valentinian was proclaimed Augustus (emperor). Within a month, motivated by senior officers, he proclaimed his brother Valens, Gratian's uncle, Augustus of the Eastern empire. Gratian was appointed consul in 366 and was entitled nobilissimus puer by his father. Gratian was seven when entitled nobilissimus puer, which indicated he was to be proclaimed Augustus. Gratian's tutor was the rhetor Ausonius, who mentioned the relationship in his epigrams and a poem.

Reign
In summer 367, Valentinian became ill at Civitas Ambianensium (Amiens), raising questions about his succession. On recovery, he presented his then eight-year-old son to his troops on 24 August, as his co-augustus, passing over the customary initial step of caesar.

Junior augustus 
On 24 August 367 Gratian received from his father Valentinian the title of augustus. Valentinian, concerned with Gratian's age and inexperience, stated his son would assist commanders with upcoming campaigns.  The magister peditum Merobaudes, together with the comes rei militaris Sebastianus, was sent by Valentinian to campaign against the Quadi.

Around 370, Gratian's mother Marina Severa died and was interred in the Church of the Holy Apostles. Valentinian married again, wedding Justina. On 9 April 370, according to the Consularia Constantinopolitana and the Chronicon Paschale, the Church of the Holy Apostles adjoining the Mausoleum of Constantine in Constantinople was inaugurated. In autumn 371, Gratian's half brother, called Valentinian, was born to Justina, possibly at Augusta Treverorum (Trier).

Gratian, who was then 15, was married in 374 to Constantius II's 13 year-old posthumous daughter Flavia Maxima Constantia at Trier. This marriage consolidated the dynastic link to the Constantinian dynasty, as had his father Valentinian I's second marriage to Justina, with her family connections.

When a party of Alamanni visited Valentinian's headquarters to receive the customary gifts towards the end of 364, Ursatius, the magister officiorum made them an offering they considered inferior to that of his predecessor. Angered by Ursatius' attitude, they vowed revenge and crossed over the Rhine into Roman Germania and Gaul in January 365, overwhelming the Roman defences. Although at first unsuccessful, eventually Jovinus, the magister equitum in Gaul inflicted heavy losses on the enemy at Scarpona (Dieulouard) and at Catalauni (Châlons-sur-Marne), forcing them to retire. An opportunity to further weaken the Alamanni occurred in the summer of 368, when king Vithicabius was murdered in a coup, and Valentinian and his son Gratian crossed the river Moenus (the Main) laying waste to Alamannic territories.  Gratian was awarded the victory titles of Germanicus Maximus and Alamannicus Maximus, and Francicus Maximus and Gothicus Maximus in 369.

Valentinian fortified the frontier from Raetia in the east to the Belgic channel, but the construction was attacked by Alamanni at Mount Pirus (the Spitzberg, Rottenburg am Neckar). In 369 (or 370) Valentinian then sought to enlist the help of the Burgundians, who were involved in a dispute with the Alamanni, but a communication failure led to them returning to their lands without joining forces with the Romans. It was then that the magister equitum, Theodosius the Elder and his son Theodosius (the Theodosi) attacked the Alamanni through Raetia, taking many prisoners and resettling them in the Po Valley in Italy. Valentinian made one attempt to capture Macrianus in 372, but eventually made peace with him in 374.

The necessity to make peace was the increasing threat from other peoples, the Quadi and the Sarmatians. Valentinian's decision to establish garrisons across the Danube had angered them, and the situation escalated after the Quadi king, Gabinus, was killed during negotiations with the Romans in 374. Consequently, in the autumn, the Quadi crossed the Danube plundering Pannonia and the provinces to the south. The situation deteriorated further once the Sarmatians made common cause inflicting heavy losses on the Pannonica and Moesiaca legions. However, on encountering Theodosius' forces on the borders of Moesia in the eastern Balkans, which had previously defeated one of their armies in 373, they sued for peace. Valentinian mounted a further offensive against the Quadi in August 375, this time using a pincer movement, one force attacking from the northwest, while Valentinian himself headed to Aquincum (Budapest), crossed the Danube and attacked from the southeast. This campaign resulted in heavy losses to the enemy, following which he returned to Aquincum and from there to Brigetio (Szőny, Hungary) where he died suddenly in November.

When his father died on 17 November 375, Gratian inherited the administration of the western empire. Days later, Gratian's half-brother Valentinian was acclaimed augustus by troops in Pannonia. Despite Valentinian being given nominal authority over the praetorian prefectures of Italy, Illyricum, and Africa, Gratian ruled the western Roman empire himself. Following his death, Valentinian's body was prepared for burial and started its journey to Constantinople, where it arrived the following year, on 28 December 376, but was not yet buried.

With the death of Valentinian I, in the east Valens became the senior augustus and the 16 year old Gratian was the only augustus in the western empire. To complicate matters further for Gratian, certain among Valentinian's generals then promoted his four-year-old second son Valentinian II (Gratian's half brother), the army on the Danube acclaiming him augustus in a palatine coup at Aquincum (Budapest) on 22 November 375, despite Gratian's existing prerogatives. The young Valentinian II was essentially the subject of the influence of his courtiers and mother, the Arian Christian Justina. Gratian's tutor, Ausonius, became his quaestor, and together with the magister militum, Merobaudes, the power behind the throne. Negotiations eventually left Gratian as the senior western emperor. Valens and Valentinian II were consuls for the year 376, Valens's fifth consulship. Neither Gratian or Valentinian travelled much, which was thought to be due to not wanting the populace to realise how young they were. Gratian is said to have visited Rome in 376, possibly to celebrate his decennalia on 24 August, but whether the visit actually took place is disputed. Under the tutorage of Ausonius, Gratian issued an edict of tolerance at Sirmium in 378. The edict restored bishops exiled by Valens and ensured religious freedoms to all religions.

Gratian's uncle Valens, returning from a campaign against the Sasanian Empire, had sent a request to Gratian for reinforcements against the Goths. According to Ammianus Marcellinus, Valens also requested that Sebastianus be sent to him for the war, though according to Zosimus Sebastianus went to Constantinople of his own accord as a result of intrigues by eunuchs at the western court. Once Gratian had put down the invasions in the west in early 378, he notified Valens that he was returning to Thrace to assist him in his struggle against the Goths. Late in July, Valens was informed that the Goths were advancing on Adrianople (Edirne) and Nice, and started to move his forces into the area. However, Gratian's arrival was delayed by an encounter with Alans at Castra Martis, in Dacia in the western Balkans. Advised of the wisdom of awaiting the western army, Valens decided to ignore this advice because he was sure of victory and unwilling to share the glory. The forces Gratian sent never reached Valens due to its commander feigning illness. Weeks later, Gratian had arrived in Castra Martis with a few thousand men, by which time Valens was at Adrianople. Aware that Gratian's forces were not going to arrive, Valens attacked the Gothic army and as a result thousands of Romans died in the Battle of Adrianople along with Sebastianus and the emperor himself.

Senior augustus 
Following the battle of Adrianople, the Goths raided from Thrace in 378 to Illyricum the following year. Convinced that one emperor alone was incapable of repelling the inundation of foes on several different fronts, Gratian, now senior augustus following Valens's death, appointed Theodosius I augustus on 19 January 379 to govern the east. Theodosius the Elder, who had died in 375, was then deified . On 3 August that year, Gratian issued an edict against heresy.

In 380, Gratian was made consul for the fifth time and Theodosius for the first. In September the augusti Gratian and Theodosius met, returning the Roman diocese of Dacia to Gratian's control and that of Macedonia to Valentinian II. The same year, Gratian won a victory, possibly over the Alamanni, that was announced officially at Constantinople. In the autumn of 378 Gratian issued an edict of religious toleration.

By 380, the Greuthungi tribe of Goths moved into Pannonia, only to be defeated by Gratian. Consequently, the Vandals and Alemanni were threatening to cross the Rhine, now that Gratian had departed from the region. With the collapse of the Danube frontier under the incursions of the Huns and Goths, Gratian moved his seat from Augusta Treverorum (Trier) to Mediolanum (Milan) in 381, and was increasingly aligned with the city's bishop, Ambrose (374–397), and the Roman Senate, shifting the balance of power within the factions of the western empire. Under the influence of Ambrose, bishop of Mediolanum (Milan), took active steps against pagan worship.

On 27 February 380, Gratian, Valentinian II, and Theodosius issued the Edict of Thessalonica. This edict made Nicene Christianity the only legal form of Christianity and outlawed all other forms of religion. This brought to an end a period of widespread religious tolerance that had existed since the death of Julian. Gratian was then forthright in his promotion of Nicene Christianity. He ordered the removal of the Altar of Victory from the Roman Senate's Curia Julia in the winter of 382/383. State endowments for pagan cults were cancelled. According to the late 5th/early 6th-century Greek historian Zosimus, Gratian refused the robe of office of the pontifex maximus, though this story is not creditable, because no such garment was associated with the priesthood.

According to the Consularia Constantinopolitana, Gratian's father's remains were eventually interred in the Mausoleum of Constantine, to which the Church of the Holy Apostles was attached, on 21 February 382, beside those of his first wife and the mother of Gratian, Marina Severa.

In 382, Gratian issued edicts that removed the statue of the winged goddess Victory from the Senate floor, removed the privileges of Vestal Virgins, and confiscated money designated for sacrifices and ceremonies. Gratian declared that all of the pagan temples and shrines were to be confiscated by the government and that their revenues were to be joined to the property of the treasury. This resulted in protests from the Roman Senate led by Symmachus, which in turn was counter-protested by Christian senators led by Pope Damasus.

Sometime in 383, Gratian's wife Constantia died. Gratian remarried, wedding Laeta, whose father was a consularis of Roman Syria. Both marriages remained childless.

In the summer of 383 Gratian was again at war with the Alamanni in Raetia. Gratian alienated the army by his favouritism towards his Alan deserters, whom he made his bodyguards and to whom he gave military commands. This favouritism towards former enemies and the paganism of the Alans angered Gratian's Christian army. By 383 the Roman general Magnus Maximus had raised the standard of revolt in Britain and invaded Gaul with a large army. Magnus Maximus, who had served under the comes Theodosius and had won a victory over the Picts in 382, was proclaimed augustus and crossed the channel, encamping near Paris. There, his forces encountered Gratian, but much of the latter's army defected to this usurper, forcing Gratian to flee.

Death and burial 
Gratian was pursued by Andragathius, Maximus' magister equitum and killed at Lugdunum (Lyon) on 25 August 383, according to the Consularia Constantinopolitana. Maximus then established his court at the former imperial residence in Trier. On the death of Gratian in 383, the 12 year old Valentinian II became the sole legitimate augustus in the west.

The body of Constantia, Gratian's first wife, who had died earlier that year, arrived in Constantinople on 12 September 383 and was buried in the complex of the Church of the Holy Apostles (Apostoleion) on 1 December, the resting place of a number of members of the imperial family, starting with Constantine in 337, under the direction of Theodosius, who had embarked on making the site a dynastic symbol. This was the last occasion that a member of the western imperial family was buried in the east, as a new mausoleum was being built at St Peter's Basilica in Rome. According to Augustine of Hippo's The City of God and Theodoret's Historia Ecclesiastica, Gratian and Constantia had had a son, who died in infancy before 383 but had been born before 379. It would not be until 387, possibly even after the death of Magnus Maximus, that Gratian's remains were interred at Mediolanum in the imperial mausoleum.

See also

List of Roman emperors

Notes

References

Sources

External links
 
 
 Flavius Gratianus (AD 359 – AD 383)
 This list of Roman laws of the fourth century shows laws passed by Gratian relating to Christianity.

359 births
383 deaths
4th-century Christians
4th-century executions
4th-century murdered monarchs
4th-century Roman emperors
4th-century Roman consuls
Deified Roman emperors
Executed Roman emperors
Illyrian people
Imperial Roman consuls
People executed by the Roman Empire
People from Sirmium
Sons of Roman emperors
Valentinianic dynasty
Illyrian emperors